Boonville Public Square Historic District is a national historic district located at Boonville, Warrick County, Indiana. It encompasses 50 contributing buildings in the central business district of Boonville.  It developed between about 1855 and 1934, and includes representative examples of Italianate, Beaux-Arts, Queen Anne, Tudor Revival, and Art Deco style architecture. Located in the district is the separately listed Old Warrick County Jail.  Other notable buildings include the Warrick County Courthouse (1904), Boonville Standard (Mellen) Building (1902), I.O.O.F. Building (1896), Peoples' Bank (1939), Carnegie Library (1918), Trimble Block (1903), and Farmers & Merchants Bank (1902).

It was listed on the National Register of Historic Places in 1987.

References

Historic districts on the National Register of Historic Places in Indiana
Beaux-Arts architecture in Indiana
Italianate architecture in Indiana
Tudor Revival architecture in Indiana
Queen Anne architecture in Indiana
Art Deco architecture in Indiana
Historic districts in Warrick County, Indiana
National Register of Historic Places in Warrick County, Indiana